The current state flag of New South Wales was officially adopted by the government of New South Wales in 1876.

The flag is based on the defaced British Blue Ensign with the state badge located in the fly. The badge, based on the coat of arms, is a white disc with the cross of St George, a golden lion passant guardant in the centre of the cross and an eight-pointed gold star on each arm of the cross.

This flag was adopted due to criticisms from the British Admiralty that the previous design was too similar to the design of the Victorian flag.

The state badge was designed by the Colonial Architect James Barnet and Captain Francis Hixson, a retired Royal Navy officer. Even though no meaning for the design was given, it is perhaps a simplified version of what was the semi-official arms of New South Wales at the time.

Construction 
Unlike the national flag, the flag of New South Wales is not enshrined and protected by any acts of state or Commonwealth government. As a result, there are no official legal requirements for the construction of the flag of New South Wales. However, tradition and decorum dictate that is should be:

 the Union Jack occupying the upper quarter next the staff.
 the fly is to be wholly blue, in line with the British Blue Ensign.
 the State Badge is to be situated with its centre halfway between the edge of the canton and the end of the fly, and a third of the distance from the bottom of the flag.

Other flags

Historical flags

The first flag of New South Wales was adopted 1867. It too was a defaced British Blue Ensign with the letters "NSW" in white located in the fly. The flag was a response to the passing of the British Colonial Naval Defence Act 1865 in which all colonial vessels should "wear the Blue/Red Ensign with the seal or badge of the colony in the fly thereof".

New South Wales then adopted a second flag in 1870 and it was almost identical to that of Victoria (with gold stars; 5, 6, 7, 8, 9 points). This flag was also a defaced British Blue Ensign with the "Governor's Badge" located in the fly. The badge was the Southern Cross and an imperial crown situated above the Southern Cross. The difference between this flag and that of the Victorian flag was that the stars were gold and ranged from five to nine points with each star having one point pointing to the bottom of the flag.

See also 
Coat of arms of New South Wales
List of Australian flags
Flags of the Governors of the Australian states

References 

Flag
Flags of Australian states and territories
Blue Ensigns
1876 establishments in Australia
Flags introduced in 1876
Flags displaying animals